The following is a list of bays in Scotland.

A

B

C

D

E

F

G

H

I

K

L

M

N

O

P

R

S

T

U

W

Inner Hebrides

Outer Hebrides

Orkney Islands

Shetland Islands

Firth of Clyde

Arran

Great Cumbrae

Little Cumbrae

See also
Firths of Scotland
Lochs of Scotland

References

Bays
Scotland